Maria Theresia Isabella von Blumenthal (1712 in Namur – 1782 in Berlin), was a German court official.   

She was the lady-in-waiting to Princess Wilhelmina of Hesse-Kassel. She became known as a philanthropist in contemporary Prussia.

References 

1712 births
1782 deaths
German ladies-in-waiting